The Palmyra-Macedon Central School District is a public school district in New York State that serves slightly under 2000 students in the villages and towns of Palmyra and Macedon in Wayne County with a staff of 385 employees (54% teaching staff, 43% support staff, 4% administrative staff).

The average class size is 17–19 students (high school), and 21 in lower grades.

Robert R. Ike is the Superintendent of Schools and Ralph Brongo is the Assistant Superintendent for Business. Ryan Pacette is the Assistant Superintendent for Instruction.

Board of Education
The Board of Education (BOE) consists of nine members who serve rotating three-year terms. Elections are held each May for board members and to vote on the school district budget.

As of June 2013, John R. Kratzert is president of the Board.

Schools
The district operates one elementary, one intermediate, one middle and one high school.

Elementary schools
 Palmyra-Macedon Primary School (Palmyra) (PK-2)
 Palmyra-Macedon Intermediate School (Macedon) (3-5)

Middle school
Palmyra-Macedon Middle School (6-8)

High school
Palmyra-Macedon High School (9-12)

Performance
The district's 94.3% graduation rate exceeds the State Standard of 55%. Approximately 73% of students continue to post-secondary education; 40% of the class of 2012 enrolled in four-year colleges.

References

External links

School districts in New York (state)
Education in Wayne County, New York
School districts established in 1950